The 1980–81 NBA season was the Bullets 20th season in the NBA and their 8th season in the city of Washington, D.C. Following the season, Wes Unseld retired, Elvin Hayes was traded to the Houston Rockets, and Mitch Kupchak signed with the Los Angeles Lakers.

Draft picks

Roster

Regular season

Season standings

Notes
 z, y – division champions
 x – clinched playoff spot

Record vs. opponents

Game log

Regular season

|- align="center" bgcolor="#ccffcc"
| 1
| October 10
| @ Detroit
| W 95–85
|
|
|
| Pontiac Silverdome
| 1–0
|- align="center" bgcolor="#ffcccc"
| 2
| October 11
| Philadelphia
| L 120–126 (2OT)
|
|
|
| Capital Centre
| 1–1
|- align="center" bgcolor="#ffcccc"
| 3
| October 16
| @ Cleveland
| L 88–90
|
|
|
| Richfield Coliseum
| 1–2
|- align="center" bgcolor="#ffcccc"
| 4
| October 17
| New Jersey
| L 112–114
|
|
|
| Capital Centre
| 1–3
|- align="center" bgcolor="#ffcccc"
| 5
| October 18
| @ Philadelphia
| L 101–117
|
|
|
| The Spectrum
| 1–4
|- align="center" bgcolor="#ccffcc"
| 6
| October 22
| Cleveland
| W 109–96
|
|
|
| Capital Centre
| 2–4
|- align="center" bgcolor="#ffcccc"
| 7
| October 24
| @ Chicago
| L 96–104
|
|
|
| Chicago Stadium
| 2–5
|- align="center" bgcolor="#ffcccc"
| 8
| October 25
| Boston
| L 87–103
|
|
|
| Capital Centre
| 2–6
|- align="center" bgcolor="#ffcccc"
| 9
| October 26
| @ Milwaukee
| L 88–111
|
|
|
| MECCA Arena
| 2–7
|- align="center" bgcolor="#ffcccc"
| 10
| January 25
| @ New Jersey
| L 98–100
|
|
|
| Rutgers Athletic Center
| 2–8

|- align="center" bgcolor="#ffcccc"
| 11
| November 1
| @ New York
| L 93–111
|
|
|
| Madison Square Garden
| 2–9
|- align="center" bgcolor="#ccffcc"
| 12
| November 4
| Atlanta
| W 122–98
|
|
|
| Capital Centre
| 3–9
|- align="center" bgcolor="#ccffcc"
| 13
| November 6
| Dallas
| W 116–95
|
|
|
| Capital Centre
| 4–9
|- align="center" bgcolor="#ccffcc"
| 14
| November 7
| Detroit
| W 114–88
|
|
|
| Capital Centre
| 5–9
|- align="center" bgcolor="#ccffcc"
| 15
| November 11
| Denver
| W 107–92
|
|
|
| Capital Centre
| 6–9
|- align="center" bgcolor="#ffcccc"
| 16
| November 12
| @ Boston
| L 86–93
|
|
|
| Boston Garden
| 6–10
|- align="center" bgcolor="#ffcccc"
| 17
| November 14
| @ Indiana
| L 108–118
|
|
|
| Market Square Arena
| 6–11
|- align="center" bgcolor="#ccffcc"
| 18
| November 15
| @ Atlanta
| W 100–88
|
|
|
| The Omni
| 7–11
|- align="center" bgcolor="#ffcccc"
| 19
| November 18
| Golden State
| L 97–103
|
|
|
| Capital Centre
| 7–12
|- align="center" bgcolor="#ccffcc"
| 20
| November 21
| San Diego
| W 102–90
|
|
|
| Capital Centre
| 8–12
|- align="center" bgcolor="#ffcccc"
| 21
| November 22
| @ Chicago
| L 101–114
|
|
|
| Chicago Stadium
| 8–13
|- align="center" bgcolor="#ccffcc"
| 22
| November 27
| Indiana
| W 123–108
|
|
|
| Capital Centre
| 9–13
|- align="center" bgcolor="#ffcccc"
| 24
| November 28
| @ Cleveland
| L 105–126
|
|
|
| Richfield Coliseum
| 9–14
|- align="center" bgcolor="#ccffcc"
| 24
| November 29
| Milwaukee
| W 98–89
|
|
|
| Capital Centre
| 10–14

|- align="center" bgcolor="#ccffcc"
| 25
| December 2
| Kansas City
| W 107–103
|
|
|
| Capital Centre
| 11–14
|- align="center" bgcolor="#ffcccc"
| 26
| December 3
| @ Indiana
| L 115–128
|
|
|
| Market Square Arena
| 11–15
|- align="center" bgcolor="#ccffcc"
| 27
| December 5
| Detroit
| W 103–92
|
|
|
| Capital Centre
| 12–15
|- align="center" bgcolor="#ccffcc"
| 28
| December 7
| @ Boston(at Hartford, Connecticut)
| W 113–103
|
|
|
| Hartford Civic Center
| 13–15
|- align="center" bgcolor="#ffcccc"
| 29
| December 9
| @ New York
| L 104–107
|
|
|
| Madison Square Garden
| 13–16
|- align="center" bgcolor="#ffcccc"
| 30
| December 10
| Boston
| L 99–101
|
|
|
| Capital Centre
| 13–17
|- align="center" bgcolor="#ffcccc"
| 31
| December 12
| @ Philadelphia
| L 79–95
|
|
|
| The Spectrum
| 13–18
|- align="center" bgcolor="#ccffcc"
| 32
| December 13
| Indiana
| W 114–105
|
|
|
| Capital Centre
| 14–18
|- align="center" bgcolor="#ffcccc"
| 33
| December 16
| Chicago
| L 94–96
|
|
|
| Capital Centre
| 14–19
|- align="center" bgcolor="#ffcccc"
| 34
| December 19
| New York
| L 96–102
|
|
|
| Capital Centre
| 14–20
|- align="center" bgcolor="#ffcccc"
| 35
| December 23
| @ Atlanta
| L 83–100
|
|
|
| The Omni
| 14–21
|- align="center" bgcolor="#ccffcc"
| 36
| December 25
| New Jersey
| W 109–94
|
|
|
| Capital Centre
| 15–21
|- align="center" bgcolor="#ccffcc"
| 37
| December 27
| Houston
| W 115–97
|
|
|
| Capital Centre
| 16–21
|- align="center" bgcolor="#ffcccc"
| 38
| December 30
| Milwaukee
| L 94–115
|
|
|
| Capital Centre
| 16–22

|- align="center" bgcolor="#ffcccc"
| 39
| January 2
| Chicago
| L 82–92
|
|
|
| Capital Centre
| 16–23
|- align="center" bgcolor="#ffcccc"
| 40
| January 3
| @ Cleveland
| L 112–132
|
|
|
| Richfield Coliseum
| 16–24
|- align="center" bgcolor="#ffcccc"
| 41
| January 6
| @ Los Angeles
| L 98–107
|
|
|
| The Forum
| 16–25
|- align="center" bgcolor="#ffcccc"
| 42
| January 8
| @ Kansas City
| L 118–136
|
|
|
| Kemper Arena
| 16–26
|- align="center" bgcolor="#ccffcc"
| 43
| January 10
| @ Dallas
| W 106–94
|
|
|
| Reunion Arena
| 17–26
|- align="center" bgcolor="#ffcccc"
| 44
| January 11
| @ San Antonio
| L 106–137
|
|
|
| HemisFair Arena
| 17–27
|- align="center" bgcolor="#ccffcc"
| 45
| January 14
| Los Angeles
| W 114–104
|
|
|
| Capital Centre
| 18–27
|- align="center" bgcolor="#ccffcc"
| 46
| January 15
| @ Detroit
| W 106–89
|
|
|
| Pontiac Silverdome
| 19–27
|- align="center" bgcolor="#ccffcc"
| 47
| January 17
| San Antonio
| W 103–93
|
|
|
| Capital Centre
| 20–27
|- align="center" bgcolor="#ccffcc"
| 48
| January 18
| New Jersey
| W 110–99
|
|
|
| Capital Centre
| 21–27
|- align="center" bgcolor="#ccffcc"
| 49
| January 20
| Utah
| W 121–113
|
|
|
| Capital Centre
| 22–27
|- align="center" bgcolor="#ffcccc"
| 50
| January 22
| Philadelphia
| L 116–128
|
|
|
| Capital Centre
| 22–28
|- align="center" bgcolor="#ccffcc"
| 51
| January 23
| Seattle
| W 103–91
|
|
|
| Capital Centre
| 23–28
|- align="center" bgcolor="#ccffcc"
| 54
| January 25
| @ New Jersey
| W 118–100
|
|
|
| Rutgers Athletic Center
| 24–28
|- align="center" bgcolor="#ccffcc"
| 53
| January 27
| @ Atlanta
| W 105–104
|
|
|
| The Omni
| 25–28
|- align="center" bgcolor="#ccffcc"
| 54
| January 28
| Phoenix
| W 108–98
|
|
|
| Capital Centre
| 26–28

|- align="center" bgcolor="#ffcccc"
| 55
| February 3
| @ Portland
| L 104–111 (OT)
|
|
|
| Memorial Coliseum
| 26–29
|- align="center" bgcolor="#ffcccc"
| 56
| February 4
| @ Seattle
| L 99–108
|
|
|
| Kingdome
| 26–30
|- align="center" bgcolor="#ccffcc"
| 57
| February 6
| @ Golden State
| W 116–110
|
|
|
| Oakland–Alameda County Coliseum Arena
| 27–30
|- align="center" bgcolor="#ffcccc"
| 58
| February 8
| @ Phoenix
| L 107–113 (OT)
|
|
|
| Arizona Veterans Memorial Coliseum
| 27–31
|- align="center" bgcolor="#ccffcc"
| 59
| February 10
| @ Denver
| W 115–110
|
|
|
| McNichols Sports Arena
| 28–31
|- align="center" bgcolor="#ccffcc"
| 60
| February 13
| @ Philadelphia
| W 104–102
|
|
|
| The Spectrum
| 29–31
|- align="center" bgcolor="#ffcccc"
| 61
| February 14
| @ Detroit
| L 103–105
|
|
|
| Pontiac Silverdome
| 29–32
|- align="center" bgcolor="#ffcccc"
| 62
| February 17
| Portland
| L 104–124
|
|
|
| Capital Centre
| 29–33
|- align="center" bgcolor="#ccffcc"
| 63
| February 19
| Philadelphia
| W 129–108
|
|
|
| Capital Centre
| 30–33
|- align="center" bgcolor="#ffcccc"
| 64
| February 20
| @ New York
| L 112–124
|
|
|
| Madison Square Garden
| 30–34
|- align="center" bgcolor="#ffcccc"
| 65
| February 22
| Milwaukee
| L 93–102
|
|
|
| Capital Centre
| 30–35
|- align="center" bgcolor="#ccffcc"
| 66
| February 25
| New York
| W 120–105
|
|
|
| Capital Centre
| 31–35
|- align="center" bgcolor="#ffcccc"
| 67
| February 27
| @ Chicago
| L 100–112
|
|
|
| Chicago Stadium
| 31–36

|- align="center" bgcolor="#ffcccc"
| 68
| March 1
| @ Milwaukee
| L 107–137
|
|
|
| MECCA Arena
| 31–37
|- align="center" bgcolor="#ccffcc"
| 69
| March 3
| @ Utah
| W 121–113
|
|
|
| Salt Palace Acord Arena
| 32–37
|- align="center" bgcolor="#ccffcc"
| 70
| March 4
| @ San Diego
| W 115–103
|
|
|
| San Diego Sports Arena
| 33–37
|- align="center" bgcolor="#ccffcc"
| 71
| March 6
| @ Houston
| W 105–104
|
|
|
| The Summit
| 34–37
|- align="center" bgcolor="#ccffcc"
| 72
| March 8
| Chicago
| W 103–99
|
|
|
| Capital Centre
| 35–37
|- align="center" bgcolor="#ffcccc"
| 73
| March 11
| @ New Jersey
| L 104–109
|
|
|
| Rutgers Athletic Center
| 35–38
|- align="center" bgcolor="#ffcccc"
| 74
| March 12
| Indiana
| L 107–114
|
|
|
| Capital Centre
| 35–39
|- align="center" bgcolor="#ffcccc"
| 75
| March 15
| Cleveland
| L 100–101
|
|
|
| Capital Centre
| 35–40
|- align="center" bgcolor="#ffcccc"
| 76
| March 17
| Boston
| L 91–112
|
|
|
| Capital Centre
| 35–41
|- align="center" bgcolor="#ffcccc"
| 77
| March 20
| @ Boston
| L 116–128
|
|
|
| Boston Garden
| 35–42
|- align="center" bgcolor="#ccffcc"
| 78
| March 22
| Atlanta
| W 121–101
|
|
|
| Capital Centre
| 36–42
|- align="center" bgcolor="#ccffcc"
| 79
| March 25
| New York
| W 120–105
|
|
|
| Capital Centre
| 37–42
|- align="center" bgcolor="#ffcccc"
| 80
| March 27
| @ Indiana
| L 107–122
|
|
|
| Market Square Arena
| 37–43
|- align="center" bgcolor="#ccffcc"
| 81
| March 28
| Detroit
| W 108–103
|
|
|
| Capital Centre
| 38–43
|- align="center" bgcolor="#ccffcc"
| 82
| March 29
| Cleveland
| W 138–103
|
|
|
| Capital Centre
| 39–43

Player statistics

Awards and records

Transactions

References

Washington Wizards seasons
Wash
Washing
Washing